Willow Township is a township in Greene County, Iowa, USA.

History
Willow Township was established in 1874.

Information
Land area: 36.2 sq. mi.
Water area: 0.0 sq. mi.

Demographics
Population: 161 (all rural)
Males: 81 	 (50.3%)
Females: 80 	 (49.7%)

References

Townships in Greene County, Iowa
Townships in Iowa
1874 establishments in Iowa
Populated places established in 1874